Stijn Devolder (born 29 August 1979) is a Belgian former professional road bicycle racer, who competed professionally for  (2002–2003),  (2004–2007),  (2008–2010),  (2011–2012),  (2013–2016),  (2017–2018) and  (2019).

Career
Born in Kortrijk, West Flanders, Devolder won his first professional race at the 2004 Four Days of Dunkirk, winning stage 4. His most prestigious victories are the 2007, 2010 and 2013 Belgian National Road Race Championships, the 2008 and 2009 Tour of Flanders, and the 2008 and 2010 Tour of Belgium. Devolder is a competent climber and proficient in an individual time trial but his main strength lies in the cobbled classics. Devolder led the  squad in the 2008 Tour de France but fell off the back and almost immediately stepped off his bike on the Ascent of the Col Agnel.

Devolder left  at the end of the 2012 season, and joined  on a two-year contract from the 2013 season onwards.

Major results

1996
 National Junior Road Championships
2nd Road race
2nd Time trial
1997
 1st  Road race, National Junior Road Championships
1999
 Vuelta a Navarra
1st Stages 5 & 6
 2nd Ronde van Vlaanderen U23
2000
 1st  Overall Le Triptyque des Monts et Châteaux
1st Stage 2b (ITT)
 1st Grand Prix de Waregem
 2nd Time trial, National Under-23 Road Championships
 4th Zesbergenprijs Harelbeke
2001
 1st Zesbergenprijs Harelbeke
 1st De Vlaamse Pijl
 1st Grand Prix de Waregem
 7th GP Wielerrevue
2002
 2nd GP de Fayt-le-Franc
 2nd Zellik–Galmaarden
2003
 3rd E3 Prijs Vlaanderen
 6th GP Stad Vilvoorde
 8th Grand Prix Pino Cerami
2004
 1st Stage 4 Four Days of Dunkirk
 3rd Tour du Haut Var
 6th Overall Three Days of De Panne
2005
 1st  Overall Three Days of De Panne
2006
 1st Stage 3a (ITT) Tour of Belgium
 2nd Eindhoven Team Time Trial
 4th Japan Cup
 6th Halle–Ingooigem
 8th Overall Three Days of De Panne
 8th Overall Deutschland Tour
2007
 1st  Road race, National Road Championships
 1st  Overall Tour of Austria
1st Stage 7 (ITT)
 1st Stage 4 (ITT) Three Days of De Panne
 3rd Overall Tour de Suisse
 9th Trofeo Pollença
2008
 1st  Time trial, National Road Championships
 1st  Overall Tour of Belgium
1st  Mountains classification
1st Stage 4 (ITT)
 1st  Overall Volta ao Algarve
1st Stage 4 (ITT)
 1st Tour of Flanders
 4th Overall Eneco Tour
 6th Time trial, UCI Road World Championships
 7th Overall Circuit Franco-Belge
 7th Paris–Roubaix
 9th E3 Prijs Vlaanderen
 10th Trofeo Pollença
2009
 1st Tour of Flanders
 5th Dwars door Vlaanderen
 6th E3 Prijs Vlaanderen
2010
 National Road Championships
1st  Road race
1st  Time trial
 1st  Overall Tour of Belgium
 4th Halle–Ingooigem
2011
 7th Chrono des Nations
2012
 8th Overall Three Days of De Panne
2013
 1st  Road race, National Road Championships
 8th Brabantse Pijl
2014
 4th Overall Driedaagse van West-Vlaanderen
2015
 2nd Overall Three Days of De Panne
2017
 4th Rad am Ring

References

External links

Eurosport Profile

Living people
1979 births
Belgian male cyclists
Sportspeople from Kortrijk
Cyclists from West Flanders